Hardwell & Friends Vol. 1 is the debut extended play by Dutch DJ Robbert Van De Corput, better known as Hardwell. Released on 28 July 2017, it is the first volume of the Hardwell & Friends EP series.

Background 
Hardwell announced the release of two EPs on 10 June 2017 during an interview at Ultra Singapore. He also announced the song "Badam" with Henry Fong and Mr. Vegas. In mid of July 2017, the cover art of the first volume appeared on the internet.

Singles 
Before it was released, Hardwell published the tracklist as single-tracks on Spotify and iTunes.
"We Are Legends" was the first single, released on 24 July 2017. It was first played at Castello A Mare, Palermo, Italy in June 2016, but indeed as an instrumental version.

"We Are One" was published one day after and premiered at Ultra Music Festival 2016. On 20 June 2017, the song was already released in different Asian countries with vocals by Taiwanese singer Jolin Tsai.

"Police (You Ain't Ready)" was released as the third single on 25 July 2017. It was produced with Portuguese DJ Kura, who collaborated with Hardwell once, for the song "Calavera".

"All That We Are Living For" followed on 27 July 2017. It was developed in cooperation with Atmozfears and singer M.Bronx.

"Smash This Beat" was published on 28 July 2017 as the final release. Behind the track, there is a collaboration with newcomer Maddix, who is part of Revealed Recording since 2016.

Track listing

Release history

References 

2017 debut EPs
Hardwell albums